Reginald L. Myles is a former professional American football player who played defensive back for four seasons for the Cincinnati Bengals

Career
Myles played cornerback for the Alabama Crimson Tide.

References

1979 births
American football safeties
Alabama Crimson Tide football players
Cincinnati Bengals players
Living people